4401 Aditi, provisional designation , is an eccentric, stony asteroid, classified as a near-Earth object and Amor asteroid, approximately 1.8 kilometers in diameter. It was discovered on 14 October 1985 by American astronomer Carolyn Shoemaker at Palomar Observatory in California, and later named after the Hindu goddess Aditi.

Classification and orbit 
Aditi orbits the Sun at a distance of 1.1–4.0 AU once every 4 years and 2 months (1,513 days). Its orbit has an eccentricity of 0.56 and an inclination of 27° with respect to the ecliptic. The asteroid's observation arc begins with its discovery, as no precoveries were taken and no identifications were made before 1985.

Physical characteristics

Lightcurves 

Two rotational lightcurves of Aditi were obtained from photometric observations by American astronomer Brian Warner at his Palmer Divide Observatory, Colorado, in August 2014 and March 2015, respectively. The first lightcurve rendered a period of  hours with a brightness variation of 0.64, while the second one gave a period of  hours with an amplitude of 0.29 magnitude.

Additional lightcurves were obtained by Benishek and Manzini.

Diameter and albedo 

According to the survey carried out by NASA's space-based Wide-field Infrared Survey Explorer with its subsequent NEOWISE mission, Aditi has a high albedo of 0.34 with a corresponding diameter of 1.80 kilometers.

The Collaborative Asteroid Lightcurve Link assumes a standard albedo for stony S-type asteroids of 0.20 and calculates a slightly larger diameter of 1.88 kilometers, as the lower the body's albedo (reflectivity), the higher its diameter, at a constant absolute magnitude (brightness).

Naming 

This minor planet is named after the Hindu goddess Aditi, celestial mother of every existing form and being. She was the mother of the thirty-three gods, including the Vasus, the Rudras, and the Ādityas, the twelve zodiacal spirits. She is described in Vedic literature as the gods of the heavenly light. The official naming citation was published on 30 January 1991.

Notes

References

External links 
 NEODyS-2 for (4401) Aditi 
 earn.dlr.de/nea for (4401) Aditi
  
 Asteroid Lightcurve Database (LCDB), query form (info )
 Dictionary of Minor Planet Names, Google books
 Asteroids and comets rotation curves, CdR Observatoire de Genève, Raoul Behrend
 
 
 

004401
Discoveries by Carolyn S. Shoemaker
Named minor planets
19851014